Dotham is an unincorporated community in Atchison County, in the U.S. state of Missouri.

History
A post office called Dotham was established in 1879, and remained in operation until 1902. The community most likely derives its name from the ancient city of Dothan.

References

Unincorporated communities in Atchison County, Missouri
Unincorporated communities in Missouri